The Judi-Dart is a United States sounding rocket. The Judi-Dart was launched 89 times between 1964 and 1970. The Judi-Dart has a length of 2.70 metres, a dimetre of 0.08 metres, a maximum flight altitude of 65 kilometres and a launch thrust of 9000 newtons.

External links 
 Encyclopedia Astronautica at astronautix.com

Sounding rockets of the United States